The Swatow Operation (June 21–27, 1939) was part of a campaign by Japan during the Second Sino-Japanese War to blockade China in order to prevent it from communicating with the outside world and importing needed arms and materials. Control of Swatow and its harbour would provide a base to make the blockade of Guangdong province more effective.

Order of battle Swatow Operation 

Part of Goto Detachment and a part of Sasebo 9th SNLF landed on the east coast on June 21 near the airfield east Swatow. Other Japanese troops in more than ten motor boats 
proceeded up the Han river and landed at Mei-hsi (near modern Anbu) cutting the road between Swatow north to Chao-chow.  A coordinated attack by the Japanese drove the Chinese defenders, Hua Chen-chung's brigade and local militia units, from the city of Swatow. They fell back to the Yenfu–Meihsi line on June 23. 

The Japanese also had landed at Jiao Yu, the island south of Swatow, on June 22. They occupied the whole island by June 24.  The Chinese fell back to Fuyang on the 24th to block the approaches to Chaochow as the Japanese landed reinforcements.  Proceeding north in pursuit the Japanese also sent forces up the river and landed in the Chinese rear, part of the Chinese force then fell back into the city while the remainder moved into the mountains northwest of the city. The Japanese advancing from the west captured Chaochow by June 27 after heavy street fighting.  Later the Chinese sent reinforcements of the 5th Reserve Division, and 1st Advance Column to block the Japanese from further advances and conduct guerrilla warfare on their positions and lines of communications.

References 
Hsu Long-hsuen and Chang Ming-kai, History of The Sino-Japanese War (1937–1945) 2nd Ed.,1971. Translated by Wen Ha-hsiung, Chung Wu Publishing; 33, 140th Lane, Tung-hwa Street, Taipei, Taiwan Republic of China.  Pg. 492-493
 中国抗日战争正面战场作战记 China's Anti-Japanese War Combat Operations
 Author : Guo Rugui, editor-in-chief Huang Yuzhang
 Press : Jiangsu People's Publishing House
 Date published : 2005-7-1
 
 Online in Chinese 
  第七部分：相持阶段前期的作战海南岛作战 2 Shantou battles
 The Japanese OOB of Swatow Operation

External links 
  Map of Swatow Operation

Battles of the Second Sino-Japanese War
1939 in China
1939 in Japan
Military history of Guangdong
Conflicts in 1939
June 1939 events